Lim Shengyu (born 7 December 1990) is a Singaporean professional basketball player who plays forward, most recently for the Singapore Slingers in the Asean Basketball League (ABL).

After winning the Most Valuable Player Award in both his two years playing for Hwa Chong Institution, Shengyu was selected as one of three Singaporean players to attend the prestigious Adidas Nations basketball camp in Shanghai and the only player to represent Singapore to participate in the NBA Without Borders Camp in New Delhi in 2008.

Lim also spent 10 years in the Singapore National Basketball (Senior) team, winning 2 bronze medals for his country in both the 2013 and 2015 editions of the Southeast Asian Games. Lim is best known for his sharp-shooting, especially his ability to make the three-point shot.

Education 
In 2016, Lim completed his degree in Environmental Engineering from Asia's top university, the National University of Singapore, with first-class honours.

Club career

On 1 September 2010 Lim was one of the four new rookies that signed with the Singapore Slingers in the team's attempt to booster a bigger and taller line-up as compared to previous seasons.

On 29 November 2011 Lim, together with Wong Wei Long and Desmond Oh, formed the first trio of Singaporeans that signed new contracts with the Slingers for the 2012 ASEAN Basketball League Season.

On 16 March 2013, during the ABL Hoops fest, despite being the youngest participant in the competition, Lim won the first-ever ABL three-point shoot-out contest during the Sapporo Slam Jam event. He scored 14 points in the first round, topping all players and establishing an ABL three-point shoot-out record. In the final round, he finished with 13 points, defeating Leo Avenido to claim the crown.

In July 2011, Lim Shengyu, along with Steven Khoo and Al Vergara, played for Singapore Siglap, one of the 4 teams competing in the 2011 Malaysia National Basketball League.

International career

Lim was a member of the 2011 Southeast Asian Games Singapore national basketball team. He led the team in scoring with 14.3 per game.

Lim continued to play an integral role for the national team and helped Singapore basketball clinch its first SEA Games medal (bronze) in 34 years in the 2013 SEA Games in Myanmar since 1979.

At the 2015 SEA Games held in Singapore, Lim once again represented Team Singapore to win his second consecutive bronze medal, despite suffering a major ankle injury in the semi-finals against Indonesia.

In 2018, Lim retired from international basketball to pursue his career in coaching and private tuition.

References

1990 births
Living people
Singaporean men's basketball players
Singaporean sportspeople of Chinese descent
Singapore Slingers players
Forwards (basketball)
Southeast Asian Games bronze medalists for Singapore
Southeast Asian Games medalists in basketball
Competitors at the 2013 Southeast Asian Games
Competitors at the 2015 Southeast Asian Games
20th-century Singaporean people
21st-century Singaporean people